Maurice W. Manche Farmstead is a historic home and farm and national historic district located in Ripley Township, Rush County, Indiana.  The farmhouse was built in 1919, and is large two-story, Bungalow / American Craftsman style dwelling faced in brown brick, stucco and half-timbering. It has a low pitched roof with red ceramic tile features a connected long porte cochere and porch. Also on the property are the contributing gambrel roofed livestock barn, corn crib, windmill, scale shed, and fence.

It was listed on the National Register of Historic Places in 1989.

References

Historic districts on the National Register of Historic Places in Indiana
Farms on the National Register of Historic Places in Indiana
Houses completed in 1919
Bungalow architecture in Indiana
Historic districts in Rush County, Indiana
National Register of Historic Places in Rush County, Indiana